The 2002 VUB Open was a women's tennis tournament played on indoor hard courts at the Sibamac Arena in Bratislava, Slovakia that was part of the Tier V category of the 2002 WTA Tour. It was the fourth and final edition of the tournament and was held from 14 October until 20 October 2002. Unseeded Maja Matevžič won the singles title and earned $16,000 first-prize money.

Champions

Singles
 Maja Matevžič defeated  Iveta Benešová, 6–0, 6–1
 It was Matevžič' only singles title her career.

Doubles
 Maja Matevžič /  Henrieta Nagyová defeated  Nathalie Dechy /  Meilen Tu, 6–4, 6–0

References

External links
 ITF tournament edition details
 Tournament draws

WTA Bratislava
2002 in Slovak women's sport
2002 in Slovak tennis